Baccharis intermedia is a species of shrub native to Chile. The species was first formally described by the botanist Augustin Pyramus de Candolle in 1836.

Distribution
This species is common on coastal hills of central Chile.

Natural hybridisation
It is observed in areas, in which the habitats of Baccharis linearis and Baccharis macraei overlap or come into close contact. It is a natural hybrid of the aforementioned species and is part of a homoploid hybrid swarm. The morphology is intermediate in all aspects and shows all variations from both extremes of the parental phenotypes to intermediate forms. This is due to the back-crossing of hybrids with the parent species. The intermediate morphology is also reflected in the specific epithet intermedia, which suggests this species is intermediate between others.

References

intermedia
Plants described in 1836
Taxa named by Augustin Pyramus de Candolle
Flora of Chile
Hybrid plants
Dioecious plants